Mijandi (also Romanized as Mījandī; also known as Mejandeh and Mejandī) is a village in Gharbi Rural District, in the Central District of Ardabil County, Ardabil Province, Iran. At the 2006 census, its population was 681, in 151 families.

References 

Towns and villages in Ardabil County